Stalowa Wola is the largest city and capital of Stalowa Wola County with a population of 58,545 inhabitants, as of 31 December 2021. It is located in southeastern Poland in the Subcarpathian Voivodeship. Stalowa Wola is one of the youngest cities of Poland. It was built from scratch in the late 1930s in the forests surrounding village of Pławo. The city was designed to be a settlement for workers of Huta Stalowa Wola (known in 1938 to 1939 as Zakłady Poludniowe or Southern Works), a plant built as part of the Central Industrial Region. Stalowa Wola is home to the sports club Stal Stalowa Wola.

Location and name 
Stalowa Wola is located in the lowlands of the Sandomierz Basin, near the San river. Even today sixty percent of the total area within its administrative borders consists of natural pine forests, remnants of once extensive and primeval Sandomierz Forest. The name of the town, Stalowa Wola, can be roughly translated into English as “steel will” and comes from a statement made by General Tadeusz Kasprzycki, Minister of Military Affairs of Poland in the late 1930s in which he declared that the new Polish industrial development plan of the Central Industrial Area symbolizes the steel will of the Polish nation to modernize itself.

History
The area of today's Stalowa Wola belongs to historic Polish province of Lesser Poland. In the Kingdom of Poland, it was located in the south-eastern corner of the Sandomierz Voivodeship, near the border with Red Ruthenia. The city of Stalowa Wola was built on the site where the village of Pławo once stood, between the ancient towns of Nisko and Rozwadów. The first mentions of Pławo come from the first half of the 15th century. At the nearby village of Przyszów, there was a hunting lodge of King Władysław Jagiełło, built before 1358. In the late 15th century, Pławo was a royal village. In 1656, the area of Pławo was the site of a battle between Polish and Swedish armies. Here, in the confluence of the San and Vistula, Swedish troops of King Charles Gustav were surrounded by Stefan Czarniecki (see Swedish invasion of Poland).

Until the Partitions of Poland, Pławo belonged to Sandomierz Voivodeship. From 1772 to 1918, it was part of the Austrian province of Galicia and remained an insignificant, privately owned village. In early 1937, the government of the Second Polish Republic accepted the project of the Central Industrial Area, which included the construction of a brand new steel mill, together with a settlement for the workers. Before the outbreak of World War II, some departments of the mill were operational and several blocks of flats were built. Construction of the Southern Works, as the mill was then called, was started in dense pine forests around Pławo in March 1937. Among other things, the plant manufactured artillery cannons.

During World War II, Stalowa Wola was one of the centres of the Home Army. The settlement was captured by the Red Army in August 1944, and on April 1, 1945, Stalowa Wola received its town charter. In 1948, the mill was renamed as Huta Stalowa Wola and in 1953, a separate urban county of Stalowa Wola was created. In 1973, the town of Rozwadów was annexed, followed in 1977 by the village of Charzewice. At its peak in the 1970s, the mill employed 35,000 people, with branches scattered across southern Poland, from Radomsko to Strzyżów. Apart from the mill, Stalowa Wola has a large power plant, opened Spring 1939. In 1988, the city was one of the centres of workers' protests (see 1988 Polish strikes). Currently, Stalowa Wola is the third-largest city of the voivodeship, with a population of 60,000.

Jews in Rozwadów (a district of Stalowa Wola) 
The Rozwadów suburb of Stalowa Wola was a thriving Jewish shtetl prior to World War II and was closely associated with Tarnobrzeg and other nearby shtetls including Ulanów, Mielec, Dzików etc. These communities, infused with vitality before 1939, were utterly destroyed during the Holocaust after having been affected by World War I only some 20 years earlier. Jews in Rozwadów were a religiously observant community, i.e. traditional or Orthodox in practice. The leading rabbi of Rozwadów, similar to other rabbis of the region, followed Hasidism practice and was of the Horowitz family. In New York, a Rozwadower Rebbe established a small synagogue on the upper West Side, which continued for many decades after the war. There is a link to a yizkor book about Rozwadów which gives further notes on the Jewish life there. The Rozwadów synagogue was, until World War II, located on Attorney Street in the lower east side of NYC.

During World War II, Dr. Eugene Lazowski, a military doctor of the Polish underground Home Army, Armia Krajowa, created a fake epidemic of dangerous infectious disease, Epidemic Typhus in the town of Rozwadów (now a district of Stalowa Wola) and the surrounding villages and towns. He saved an estimated 8,000 Polish Jews from certain death in Nazi concentration camps during the Holocaust, performing his services in utmost secrecy under the threat of capital punishment.

Following the Holocaust, the remaining Jews were motivated to seek a new start in Palestine, thanks to Berihah's efforts. A community of former Rozwadów citizens had been established in New York City and continued its affinity long after World War II. Many former Rozwadów citizens of Jewish backgrounds moved to the fledgeling State of Israel.

Economy
Stalowa Wola Steel Factory (HSW S.A.) was one of the most important components of a large industrial development plan initiated by the Polish government in 1936 aiming at a creation of new Armaments and Heavy Industry Basin, which by the virtue of its geographical location (considerable distance from German and the Soviet Union frontiers), would be capable of uninterrupted production even in case of war (Central Industrial Region). Its main enterprises included power plants, steel works, automobile and aircraft factories, electrical and high technology plants. Today the main employer in the city is still HSW S.A. (manufacturer of heavy machines, alloys, and military equipment). Other large enterprises include StahlSchmidt (producer of aluminium rims), ESW (coal power plant), Prefabet Stalowa Wola (building materials) and Mostostal S.A. (steel construction-bridges, tanks and so on).

Education
Catholic University of Lublin- Stalowa Wola Subsidiary
Stalowa Wola Private College of Economics

Transport
Polish State Railways (PKP) provides scheduled connections to Lublin, Warsaw, Kraków, Katowice, Wrocław, Rzeszów, Przemyśl and Odessa (in Ukraine). Summer connections are available to the TriCity (Gdańsk, Gdynia and Sopot) and Hel. The city has several railway stations that include: Stalowa Wola, Stalowa Wola South, Stalowa Wola Centre and Stalowa Wola Rozwadów, and is a main rail junction. All four stations are located on the main Przeworsk – Skarżysko-Kamienna line. Additionally, Stalowa Wola Rozwadów provides a northern connection with Lublin and, from Stalowa Wola South, a line runs east to Zamość, via Zwierzyniec. The ZMKS is the city's main public transit agency, operating a fleet of buses in Stalowa Wola and the surrounding districts.

Sports
The city is a home for the professional football club Stal Stalowa Wola. They play their home matches at the Podkarpackie Centrum Piłki Nożnej, opened in 2020. Moreover, the city is known from the amateur football club Parafialny Klub Sportowy San Rozwadów, that compete in Klasa A.

Notable people
Marcin Nowak (born 1977), track and field and sprint athlete who competes internationally for Poland
Artur Partyka (born 1969), former high jumper and two-time Olympic medallist
Piotr Piechniak (born 1977), former Poland national football team international
Grzegorz Rosiński (born 1941), comic book artist
Omar Sangare (born 1970), actor, director and writer
Krzysztof Soszynski (born 1977), Polish-Canadian professional mixed martial arts (MMA) fighter
Ewa Strusińska (born 1976), international conductor
Krzysztof Śmiszek (born 1979), politician, human rights activist
Lucjan Trela (1942–2019), heavyweight boxer and Olympian
Maciej Zakościelny (born 1980), actor

International relations

Twin towns — Sister cities
Stalowa Wola is twinned with:

References

Notes

External links
City Website
Stal Stalowa Wola
Miasto W Fotografii

Cities and towns in Podkarpackie Voivodeship
Stalowa Wola County
Lesser Poland
Sandomierz Voivodeship
Kingdom of Galicia and Lodomeria
Lwów Voivodeship
Holocaust locations in Poland